Provanna laevis is a species of sea snail, a marine gastropod mollusk in the family Provannidae.

Description

Distribution
This marine species occurs off the Guaymas Transform Ridge, Gulf of California, Western Mexico

References

External links
 Warén A. & Ponder W.F. (1991). New species, anatomy, and systematic position of the hydrothermal vent and hydrocarbon seep gastropod family Provannidae fam.n. (Caenogastropoda). Zoologica Scripta. 20(1): 27-56
 Warén A. & Bouchet P. (2001). Gastropoda and Monoplacophora from hydrothermal vents and seeps new taxa and records. The Veliger 44(2): 116–231

laevis
Gastropods described in 1991